Ludwig is a surreal 1977 British-made children's cartoon cutout animation about a magical egg-shaped gemstone who lived in a forest. 25 five-minute episodes were made.

The programme was produced by father and son team, Mirek and Peter Lang. Peter went on to animate Pigeon Street. The Langs wrote the stories with Jane Tann and Susan Kodicek. The scripts were edited by Michael Cole. Peter did the artwork. The music was arranged and played by Paul Reade. Jon Glover provided the voice of the birdwatcher. The Langs shared the animation.

The character's name came from Ludwig van Beethoven, whose music is played in the background. The series consisted of 25 five-minute episodes, in each of which something would happen to the animals of the forest and Ludwig would come to the rescue. His "body" facets would open up and out would pop arms, legs, gadgets or even a helicopter rotor blade when he needed to get somewhere fast. He was constantly watched by a human birdwatcher (voiced by Jon Glover) who had a deerstalker and large binoculars. This character was both the viewer's point of view and narrator, as no other character talked. Many of the musical phrases are the excerpts from Beethoven’s famous Septet. At the end of every episode Ludwig played the final movement of Beethoven's first symphony through the credits.

The title music and opening theme of Ludwig is just 16 seconds long, and features first, a theme from the fifth symphony, followed by a small section of Beethoven's symphony No.1. It ends with the programme's narrator Jon Glover saying 'Ah, Ludwig' in an interested, well spoken manner. 

In the US, Ludwig was one of the cartoons featured in Captain Kangaroo.

In 2011 Charlie Brooker showed a short spoof of Ludwig, called Orlov, in the first part of his series How TV Ruined Your Life.

List of episodes
 Arrival – Ludwig's here to stay
  Hiccups
  Hooter
  Glue
  Kites
  Tennis
  Sculptor
  Skating
  Umbrellas
  Swing
  Bubbles
  Clock
  Ball
  Coin
  Yo-Yo
  Investigation - Research
  Christmas
  Home Sweet Home – Architect
  Balloons
  High Jump
  Magician
  Artist
  Party
  Nuts
  TV - Western.

References

External links 
 Little Gems - Ludwig
 Toonhound - Ludwig (1977)
Facebook fan page
 'iLudwig Website download all 25 cartoons at - http://www.iLudwig.co.uk

BBC children's television shows
British children's animated television shows
1970s British children's television series
1970s British animated television series